Manuela Rottmann (born 9 May 1972) is a German lawyer and politician of the Alliance 90/The Greens who has been a member of the Bundestag from the state of Bavaria since 2017.

In addition to her parliamentary work, Rottmann served as Parliamentary State Secretary in the  Federal Ministry of Food and Agriculture in the coalition government of Chancellor Olaf Scholz from 2021 to 2022.

Early life and education 
The daughter of a police officer, Rottmann attended elementary school in Eßleben and grammar schools in Schweinfurt, Würzburg and Hammelburg. She passed her Abitur in 1991 at the Frobenius-Gymnasium in Hammelburg.

From 1991 to 1998 Rotttmann studied political science, sociology, economics and law at the University of Würzburg, Goethe University Frankfurt and Aix-Marseille University. In 1998 she completed her studies with the First State Examination in Law in Frankfurt am Main. From 1998 to 2004 Rottmann was a research assistant at the Institute for Public Law at Goethe University. In 2004 she passed the Second State Examination in Law in Hesse. In 2006 she received her doctorate in law in Frankfurt with a thesis supervised by Georg Hermes.

Early career 
From 2004 to 2006 Rottmann was a research assistant at the German Institute of Urban Affairs (DIFU) in Berlin. From 2012 to March 2017 she worked as legal advisor for DB Netz in Frankfurt.

Political career 
In the 2002 elections, Rottmann unsuccessfully stood as a candidate in the Frankfurt am Main I electoral district. She was elected to the city council, and from 2006 to 2012 she was the head of department for health and environment.

Rottmann became a member of the Bundestag in the 2017 German federal election, representing the Bad Kissingen district. In parliament, she was a member of the Committee on Legal Affairs and Consumer Protection from 2017 until 2021.

In the negotiations to form a so-called traffic light coalition of the Social Democratic Party (SPD), the Green Party and the Free Democratic Party (FDP) following the 2021 German elections, Rottmann was part of her party's delegation in the working group on homeland security, civil rights and consumer protection, co-chaired by Christine Lambrecht, Konstantin von Notz and Wolfgang Kubicki. In November 2022 she was named as the Green candidate for the 2023 Frankfurt mayoral election.

References

External links 

  
 Bundestag biography 

1972 births
Members of the Bundestag for Bavaria
Female members of the Bundestag
21st-century German women politicians
Members of the Bundestag 2021–2025
Members of the Bundestag 2017–2021
Living people
Members of the Bundestag for Alliance 90/The Greens
People from Würzburg